is the fourth addition to the Yu-Gi-Oh! anime meta-series, as well as the 1st main spin-off series. The plot centers around Jaden Yuki and his friends, and tells of their adventures at the Duel Academy, a school that teaches students how to play the card game Duel Monsters. Season three, the Dimension World Saga, covers their third year at the Academy and the series' darker turn. This season was broadcast by 4Kids Entertainment as Yu-Gi-Oh! GX.

Summary
Jaden's limits are being tested by Professor Thelonius Viper because he was invited by Sheppard so he could improve the students' dueling. Many new faces from other Academies around the world show themselves, including Jesse Andersen, who, like Jaden, has the ability to speak to his Duel Monsters cards. Evil forces return to threaten not just Earth, but other dimensions as well, including the duel spirits' world. Jaden and his friends rise to fight this evil once again, but this time, the fight is more personal for Jaden. The "Supreme King" threatening the entire universe is actually a past incarnation of his, the dark side of his soul. Jaden soon finds himself facing the deranged duel spirit Yubel in a battle that will decide the fate of several universes, and takes the only path to defeat her, by absorbing her power into himself.

Episode list

References

General

Specific

2006 Japanese television seasons
2007 Japanese television seasons
GX (season 3)